Greenvale is an unincorporated community in Wilson County, in the U.S. state of Tennessee.

History
Greenvale was platted in 1871. A post office called Greenvale was established in 1870, and remained in operation until 1905.

Education
Greenvale is served by Wilson County Schools. Its zoned schools are Watertown Elementary School, Watertown Middle School, and Watertown High School.

References

Unincorporated communities in Wilson County, Tennessee
Unincorporated communities in Tennessee